Korijärve is a village in Valga Parish, Valga County, in southeastern Estonia. It has a population of 51 (as of 2011) and an area of 21.3 km².

Korijärve was first mentioned in 1582 as Korrigerwe.

The currently inactive Valga–Pechory railway passes Korijärve on its southern side, there's a station named "Tuulemäe".

References

Villages in Valga County
Kreis Dorpat